The 2022–23 Holy Cross Crusaders men's ice hockey season was the 59th season of play for the program, the 25th at the Division I level, and the 19th in the Atlantic Hockey conference. The Crusaders represented the College of the Holy Cross and were coached by Bill Riga, in his 2nd season.

Season

Departures

Recruiting

Roster
As of August 4, 2022.

Standings

Schedule and results

|-
!colspan=12 style=";" | Exhibition

|-
!colspan=12 style=";" | Regular Season

|-
!colspan=12 style=";" |

Scoring statistics

Goaltending statistics

Rankings

Note: USCHO did not release a poll in weeks 1, 13, or 26.

References

2022–23
2022–23 Atlantic Hockey men's ice hockey season
2022–23 NCAA Division I men's ice hockey by team
2023 in sports in Massachusetts
2022 in sports in Massachusetts